Volodymyrko Volodarovych (Volodymyrko Volodarevych, Volodymyr Volodarevich "Vladimirko") (1104 - 1152) was a Galician prince (from 1141, according to others from 1144), son of Volodar Rostyslavych.

In 1124, Volodymyrko became the prince of Zvenyhorod, and in 1129, after the death of his brother Rostyslav, he also seized Peremyshl.

He gradually brought together the Peremyshl, Zvenyhorod, Halych and the Terebovlia land, uniting them into one Principality of Halych. The capital of the principality was established at Halych in 1141 (according to some sources, in 1144), which Volodymyrko occupied after the death of his nephew Ivan.

He first failed to unite Halych with the Volyn principality, which was under the rule of Kiev Prince Vsevolod II Olgovichs. However, thanks to 
the alliance with Yuri Dolgorukiy he was able to defeat Kyiv Prince Izyaslav Mstyslavych.

In alliance with the Byzantine Emperor Manuel Comnenus, he led the long struggle against the Kingdom of Hungary, which ended only in 1152, when a peace treaty with the Hungarian king Géza was signed.

He had a son: Yaroslav Osmomysl, prince of Halych.

External links
 Volodymyrko Volodarovych  in the Internet Encyclopedia of Ukraine, vol. 5 (1993)

1104 births
1152 deaths
Rurikids
Rostislavichi family
Princes of Halych
Princes of Zvenyhorod
Princes of Terebovl'